Logan Peak, commonly referred to as Mount Logan, is a peak in the Bear River Mountains, a branch of the Wasatch Range.  Located six miles east-southeast of Logan, Utah in the Uinta-Wasatch-Cache National Forest, it is the second highest peak overlooking Cache Valley after Mt. Naomi.  Logan Peak rises to an elevation of  NAVD88. It is served by hiking trails and a narrow, unpaved access road suitable only for offroad vehicles. It is the only mountain in the Bear River Range with a road to the summit. The peak houses a weather station and a telecommunications tower. Logan Peak is a popular destination for hikers and mountain bikers during the warmer months and advanced cross-country skiers in winter. During the winter, a circular hollow on the east side of the peak, known locally as Crystal Valley, is popular with snowmobilers.

References

External links
 

Mountains of Utah
Mountains of Cache County, Utah